Circumambulation is the third studio album from American stoner rock band True Widow. It was released in July 2013 under Relapse Records.

Track listing

Personnel
Dan Phillips – vocals, guitar
Nicole Estill – bass, vocals
Timothy "Slim" Starks – drums, percussion

References

External links
Circumambulation by True Widow at iTunes.com

2013 albums
True Widow albums
Relapse Records albums